The Honda FCX (commonly referred to as Fuel Cell eXperimental) is a family of hydrogen fuel cell automobiles manufactured by Honda.

The Honda FCX and Toyota FCHV, which began leasing on December 2, 2002, became the world's first government-certified commercial hydrogen fuel cell vehicles.

As of March 2007, there are more than twenty Honda FCX vehicles in the hands of customers, including the state of New York, cities of Las Vegas, Chula Vista, San Francisco and the South Coast Air Quality Management District in three different American states.

Limited marketing of a latest fuel cell vehicle named FCX Clarity, based on the 2007 concept model, began on June 19, 2008 in Japan and the United States. Honda believes it could start mass-producing the next model evolved from the FCX concept by 2018.

1999 FCX concept and prototypes

The first prototype FCX is a four-door, four-seat vehicle that was launched in 1999. Dimensions are: length 4165 mm, width 1760 mm and height 1645 mm. The fuel cell was a PEFC (proton exchange membrane) manufactured by Ballard Power Systems. The fuel cell had power output of 78 kW.

The first vehicles were delivered on December 2, 2002, in the USA (City of Los Angeles) and Japan.

 1999 September
 Honda FCX-V1: Hydrogen vehicle model
 Honda FCX-V2: Methanol-fuel cell model
 2000 September
 Honda FCX-V3: Supercapacitor model, began tests in the public roads
 2001 September
 Honda FCX-V4: evolved version of FCX-V3
 2002 March
 Honda FCX-V4 served as pace car at the Los Angeles Marathon
 2002 July
 FCX became the world's first fuel-cell car certified by the U.S. EPA and California Air Resources Board for commercial use
 2002 December
 Honda FCX: vehicles delivered to Japanese Prime Minister's office (Kantei) and Los Angeles City
 2003 July
 Honda supplied the world's first fuel-cell vehicle to a private corporation
 2003 October
 Honda FC Stack was released. It was capable of power generation at temperatures as low as -20°C
 2004 April
 FCX were leased to the City and County of San Francisco, California, USA
 2004 June
 FCX were leased to the South Coast Air Quality Management District
 2004 July
 FC Stack-equipped FCX received U.S. government certification for commercial use
 2004 November
 FCX was leased to the City of Chula Vista, California, USA
 FC Stack-equipped FCX was leased to the State of New York and became the world's first delivery of fuel-cell vehicles to a cold-weather region
 2005 January
 FC Stack-equipped FCX delivered to Hokkaido Prefecture, Japan
 2005 February
 FCX vehicles leased to the City of Las Vegas, USA
 2007 March
 actress Q'orianka Kilcher leases Honda FCX and became the world's youngest individual customer of fuel cell vehicles
 2001-2007
 FCX was the official pace car of the Los Angeles Marathon

2002 FCX 

This FCX uses front-wheel drive and is still a three-door four-seat hatchback vehicle like its predecessor. It has a maximum output of 80 kilowatts (107 horsepower) and 282 Nm (201 foot-pounds) of torque and has an operating range of 190 miles.

The 2005 FCX was the second-generation fuel-cell vehicle (FCV) from Honda. It was Honda's first fuel-cell vehicle powered by a fuel-cell stack designed and manufactured by Honda, and was certified by both the EPA and CARB for commercial use. 
It had an EPA city/highway rating of 62/51 mpkg (57 mpkg combined). It  achieved a nearly 20-percent improvement in EPA fuel economy rating (51/46 mpkg (48 mpkg combined), a 33-percent gain in peak power (107 hp vs. 80 hp)  and also a nearly 20-percent gain in operating range compared to the 2004 FCX (a range of 160 miles). FCX was, according to Honda, the only fuel cell vehicle fully certified to meet the applicable federal government crash safety standards at the time.  Later with software upgrades for 2006 FCX, this was enhanced to 210 miles.(EPA certified)  The vehicle weighs in at 1680 kg (3700 pounds) and has a maximum speed of 150 km/h (93 mph) and a 0–100 km/h (0-60 mph) acceleration time of 11 seconds. Main hydrogen components of the vehicle include fuel cell, two hydrogen tanks behind the rear  and ultracapacitors.

This model used a fuel cell first developed in-house by Honda called the Honda FC Stack. The fuel cell was introduced in October 2003 and can operate at a low temperature of −20 °C. The type of fuel cell used is a Proton Exchange Membrane Fuel Cell. The fuel cell stack has a power of 86 kilowatts.

The hydrogen is stored into two separate containers behind the rear seat. They can accommodate a maximum of 4 kilograms (8.8 pounds) of hydrogen.

The FCX is a fully featured automobile and has features like traction control, cruise control, automatic climate control, CD player, power windows, power locks and power heated mirrors. The FCX seats four adults comfortably. The only thing new for 2006 model year is the Satellite Navigation System.

Honda originally only leased the FCX to certain corporate and government entities.  On 29 June 2005 Honda leased an FCX to its first non-commercial customer; the Spallino family of Southern California.

According to a  New York Times article in 2005, Andy Boyd, a spokesman of Honda, was quoted that the FCX's estimated expense ($1 million to $2 million) is based on "the cost of body and powertrain, and also the experimental nature of some key components, like the fuel cell itself."

2006 FCX concept

At the 2006 Detroit Auto Show, Honda announced that it would make a production version of the FCX concept shown at the 2005 Tokyo Motor Show. On 25 September 2006, this production version was unveiled. The updated four-door sedan version looks sleeker and more futuristic, and has a high focus on comfort and interior space. It has a much more spacious interior with a mixture of plastic, wood and leather.  Production is expected to begin in 2008 in Japan and the U.S. The production version will closely resemble the concept, although it is unknown if some of the concept's more radical features, such as a tilting instrument panel, will be included.

The new powerplant is 180 kg lighter, 40% smaller in volume and has a high energy efficiency of 60%, compared with 20% for most internal combustion engines, 30% for most hybrid powerplants and 50% for the previous generation FCX.

The new powerplant utilizes three electric motors: one front-drive motor with an output of up to 80 kW, this motor's shaft is coaxial with the gearbox for a more compact front-end, and two smaller motors with a maximum output of 25 kW driving one of the rear wheels each. This layout makes the FCX technically an all-wheel-drive vehicle. The updated FCX has a maximum speed of 160 km/h (100 mph).

The new FCX utilizes several interesting new features. The new V Flow fuel cell stack can operate at temperatures as low as −30 °C. This is achieved by allowing the hydrogen to flow vertically in the fuel cell stack. The tanks can store up to 5 kg (171 litres) of hydrogen at a pressure of 350 atmospheres, thanks to the new hydrogen absorption materials used.

To support the hydrogen fuel-cell technology, Honda also introduced the Home Energy Station (HES). This home solution can convert natural gas to electricity, heat and hydrogen to refuel fuel-cell vehicles. This allows consumers to refuel vehicles with hydrogen at home, important until hydrogen stations become widespread. Alternatively, the hydrogen can be used in the HES's built-in hydrogen fuel cell, providing up to 5 kW of normal or backup electricity and/or hot water for the home. According to Honda, this solution is highly efficient and reduces running costs of electricity, gas and vehicle fuel by up to 50%.

2008 FCX Clarity

On 15 November 2007 at the Greater Los Angeles Auto Show, Honda unveiled the FCX Clarity, the first production model, and announced that the car would be available for lease beginning in the summer 2008.  Initial availability will be limited to the Southern California market, with availability expanding as hydrogen fueling stations become available. Leases will only be available for 36 months at $600 per month.

References

External links
 Honda FCX (English)
 Honda FCX Technology FCX homepage (Japanese).
 Honda Fuel Cell page contains specifications of FCX, FCX Concept, Home Energy Station.
 Official FCX Concept Site for the 2009 version
 FCX Concept Test Drive Video
 2006 Honda FCX specifications
 Honda Introduces City of Las Vegas as Next Fuel Cell Customer - Honda Fuel Cell Technology Milestones
 Honda FCX Driving Experience Japan 2007

Hydrogen cars
Fuel cell vehicles
FCX
FCX